Listed below are recipients of awards for various achievements on PGA Tour Champions, a circuit operated by the U.S.-based PGA Tour for men's golfers aged 50 and over. The tour began in 1980 as the Senior PGA Tour, changed its name to the Champions Tour in 2003, and became PGA Tour Champions in 2016.

Player-elected awards
Three PGA Tour Champions year-end awards are elected by the players and announced in December.  The ceremony is held at a tournament early in the following season.  The Jack Nicklaus Trophy is for the player of the year.  The other two are the Rookie of the Year and Comeback Player of the Year awards. No season-long awards were given in 2020 as, due to the COVID-19 pandemic, the tour switched to a wraparound season encompassing all of 2020 and 2021.

Statistical awards
The Arnold Palmer Award is given to the player who earns the most PGA Tour Champions money in a season. The Byron Nelson Award goes to the player who has the lowest scoring average (strokes per round). No season-long awards were given in 2020 as, due to the COVID-19 pandemic, the tour switched to a wraparound season encompassing all of 2020 and 2021.

Charles Schwab Cup
From 2001 through 2015, points were earned for thousands of dollars earned in top-ten finishes at tournaments.  From 2008 to 2015, points were doubled at majors and the Charles Schwab Cup Championship.

Since 2016, the Charles Schwab Cup has used a playoff format similar to the FedEx Cup playoffs on the regular PGA Tour, though with three total events instead of four on the regular tour. Changes to the format are:
 During the regular season, points are based on dollars earned, regardless of the player's finish in a given tournament. No bonus is awarded for wins in majors.
 The top 72 players on the money list will qualify for the first playoff event. Additionally, a "wild card" playoff berth will be awarded to a golfer who finishes in the top 10 of the last regular-season event, the SAS Championship, and is not within the top 72 after the tournament. (If more than one player outside the top 72 finishes in the top 10 at the SAS Championship, the highest finisher among these players will qualify.)
 During the first two playoff events, points are earned as in the regular season, except the winner earns double points. The playoff field is cut to 54 after the first playoff event and 36 after the second, with the survivors advancing to the Charles Schwab Cup Championship.
 Prior to the Charles Schwab Cup Championship, the points totals are reset. All 36 qualifiers will have a theoretical chance to win the Charles Schwab Cup, and each golfer in the top five can win the Charles Schwab Cup by winning the final event, no matter how the rest of the field performs.

The top five win annuities.  Annuities involved in ties are divided amongst the tied players.

The Charles Schwab Cup was not awarded in 2020 as, due to the COVID-19 pandemic, the tour switched to a wraparound season encompassing all of 2020 and 2021.

Players of the Month
Three members of the media form a panel which determines the recipients.  The winners receive a medal.

References

External links
Official site
2006 Media Guide

Golf awards
Awards